Magi Gibson (1953) is a Scottish poet and children's author.

Early life and education 
Gibson was born in Kilsyth, Stirlingshire, in 1953. She studied French and German Literature at the University of Glasgow.

Career 
In 2000, Gibson won the Scotland on Sunday/Women 2000 Writing Prize, with her sequence The Senile Dimension, and has also won the Stirling Open Poetry prize. In 2007, she was the Writer in Residence at Glasgow's Gallery of Modern Art. From 2009-2012, Gibson held the position of Makar for the City of Stirling, the first person to hold the title in 500 years.  She was a Reader in Residence at Glasgow Women's Library, has been the recipient of three Scottish Arts Council Creative Writing Fellowships, and a Royal Literary Fund Fellowship.

Gibson has also published a series of children's novels, Seriously Sassy.

Personal life 
Gibson lives in Glasgow and is married to comedy novelist Ian Macpherson.

Works

Poetry collections 
 Graffiti in Red Lipstick
 Wild Women of a Certain Age
 Strange Fish (with Helen Lamb)
 Kicking Back
 Washing Hugh MacDiarmid's Socks (2017)

Poetry pamphlets 
 Premier Results (with Brian Whittingham)
 Death of a Wife

References 

1953 births
Scottish women poets
Alumni of the University of Glasgow
Living people